Limón y Sal ("Lemon and Salt") is the title of the fourth studio album released by Mexican singer-songwriter Julieta Venegas. Recorded in Buenos Aires, Argentina, it was first released in Mexico on May 30, 2006 and in the United States on June 6, 2006. The album's overall themes deal with the general ups and downs of life and relationships. All the songs were composed by Venegas, with the exception of three songs, where she had the help of Coti Sorokin and Cachorro López. Some notable songs are "Primer Día" with its reggae rhythm, sung in a duet with Dante Spinetta, "De Qué Me Sirve" where she plays the accordion in a tango and "bolero" fashion and "Eres Para Mí", a pop duet with Chilean singer Anita Tijoux.

It was nominated for Album of the Year at the 7th Latin Grammy Awards, winning for Best Alternative Music Album. It also won the Grammy Award for Best Latin Pop Album, sharing a historical tie with Ricardo Arjona and his album Adentro.

The song "Canciones de Amor" was used in the 2007 film The Heartbreak Kid, while "Mírame Bien" was used as the opening theme for the 2011-2012 Brazilian telenovela A Vida da Gente (The Life We Lead).

Singles
"Me Voy" was released as the lead single from the album. Widely considered Venegas's most successful song ever, it topped charts on the US Billboard Hot Latin Tracks, Mexico and Spain, while reaching the top ten on the US Billboard Latin Pop Airplay chart, number three in Italy, and number 12 in Switzerland. It was nominated for Record of the Year and Best Short Form Music Video at the 7th Latin Grammy Awards.

The second single "Limón y Sal" was released as the second single, reaching number 24 on the US Billboard Latin Pop Airplay charts, and number two in Spain and Mexico.

"Eres Para Mí", a duet with Chilean singer Anita Tijoux, was released as the third single achieving great success in 2007, topping the US Latin Pop Airplay and Mexican charts and peaking at number five on the US Hot Latin Tracks and Latin Tropical Airplay charts,  number two in Spain and number nine in Venezuela.

The fourth single was "Primer Día", featuring the rapper Dante Spinetta, having success on the music charts in Mexico and reaching number 13 in Spain.

The fifth single, "De Que Me Sirve", was released in Europe only.

Track listing

^ Additional Production * Co-producer

Personnel
 Julieta Venegas - vocals, background vocals, accordion, acoustic guitar, keyboards, programming
 Juanchi Baleiron - acoustic guitar, electric guitar, baritone guitar
 Cachorro López - Baritone guitar, electric guitar, bass guitar, keyboards
 Coti Sorokin - electric guitar, bass guitar, acoustic guitar, backing vocals
 Dany Ávila - drums
 Guillermo Vadalá - bass guitar, banjo
 Ernesto Snajer - acoustic guitar, ten-string guitar
 Facundo Guevara - percussion
 Dante Spinetta - Vocals, composer
 Juan Blas Caballero - Programming, keyboards, electric guitar
 Juan Cruz de Urquiza - flugelhorn, trombone
 Matias Sorokin - slide guitar
 Anita Tijoux - background vocals
 Sebastián Schon - keyboards, programming
 Slava Poloudine - cello
 Pepito Mezclero - Scream

Chart

Weekly charts

Certifications

Year-end charts

Awards

Latin Grammy

Grammy Award

Release history

References

2006 albums
Julieta Venegas albums
Albums produced by Cachorro López
Latin Grammy Award for Best Alternative Music Album
Grammy Award for Best Latin Pop Album
Sony International albums